Lanigan may refer to:

Places
Lanigan, Saskatchewan, a town in Saskatchewan
Lanigan Airport, an airport in Saskatchewan
Lanigan Creek, a river in Saskatchewan

People
John Lanigan (disambiguation)
Ernest Lanigan
Mike Lanigan
Jim Lanigan
Thomas Lanigan-Schmidt
Mick Lanigan
Jimmy Lanigan
Damian Lanigan
Paddy Lanigan
Mathew Lanigan

Other
Lanigan's Rabbi
Lanigan's Ball
Rahal Letterman Lanigan Racing